The culture of Rajasthan includes many artistic traditions that reflect the ancient Indian way of life. Rajasthan is also called "Land of Kings". It has many tourist attractions and facilities for tourists. This historical state of India attracts tourists and vacationers with its rich culture, tradition, heritage, and monuments. It also has some wildlife sanctuaries and national parks.

More than 70% of Rajasthan is vegetarian, which makes it the most vegetarian state in India.

Music and dance

The Ghoomar dance from Jodhpur and the Kalbeliya dance of Jaisalmer have gained international recognition. Folk music is a vital part of Rajasthani culture. Bhopa, Chang, Teratali, Ghindar, Kachchigghori, Tejaji, parth dance are examples of traditional Rajasthani culture. Folk songs are commonly ballads which relate heroic deeds and love stories; and religious or devotional songs known as bhajans and banis (often accompanied by musical instruments like dholak, sitar, sarangi etc.) are also sung.

Kanhaiya Geet also sang in major areas of east Rajasthani belt in the collection manner as a best source of entertainment in the rural areas. Ghoomar folk songs, Mumal folk songs, Chirmi folk song, and Jhorawa Folk Songs are also notable.

Kathputli

Kathputli, a traditional string puppet performance native to Rajasthani, is a key feature of village fairs, religious festivals, and social gatherings in Rajasthan. Some scholars believe the art of Kathputli to be more than thousands of years old. Mentions of Kathputli have been found in Rajasthani folk tales, ballads, and even in folk songs. Similar rod-puppets can be also found in West Bengal.

It is believed that Kathputli began as a string marionette art invented by the tribal Rajasthani Bhat community 1500 years ago. Scholars believe that folk tales convey the lifestyle of ancient Rajasthani tribal people; Kathputli art may have originated from present day Nagaur and surrounding areas. Rajasthani kings and nobles encouraged the art of Kathputli; over the last 500 years, Kathputli was supported by a system of patronage through kings and well-off families. Kathputli lovers would support artists in return for the artists singing praises of the patrons’ ancestors. The Bhat community claim that their ancestors performed for royal families, receiving honour and prestige from the rulers of Rajasthan.

Arts and crafts

Rajasthan is famous for textiles, semi-precious stones, and handicrafts, as well as for its traditional and colorful art. Rajasthani furniture is known for its intricate carvings and bright colours. Block prints, tie and dye prints, Bagaru prints, Sanganer prints and Zari embroidery are famous. Rajasthan is traditionally strong in textile products, handicrafts, gems and jewellery, dimensional stones, agro and food products. The top five export items, which contributed for the two-third of exports from the state of Rajasthan are textiles (including ready made garments) gems & jewellery, engineering goods, chemical and allied products. The blue pottery of Jaipur is particularly noted. With an intention of attracting investment for revival of traditional arts and crafts as well as promotion of cultural heritage, the first handicraft policy has been released in Rajasthan..Rajasthan has large quantity of raw materials namely marbles, wood, leather to cash on the great potential for development of handicraft. 

The  Anokhi Museum of Hand Printing celebrates traditional woodblock printing on cloth.

Architecture

Rajasthan is famous for its many historical forts, temples, and palaces (havelis), all of which are important sources of tourism in the state.

Temple architecture

While there are many Gupta and post-Gupta era temples in Rajasthan, after the 7th century, the architecture evolved into a new form called the Gurjara-Pratihara Style. Some famous temples of this style are temples at Osian, the Kumbhshyama temple of Chittor, temples at Baroli, the Somesvara temple at Kiradu, the Harshnath temple in Sikar, and the Sahasra Bahu temple of Nagda.

From the 10th century to the 13th century, a new style of temple architecture was developed, known as the Solanki style or Maru-Gurjara style. The Samadhishwar temple at Chittor and the ruined temple at Chandravati are examples of this style.

This period was also golden period for Jain temples in Rajasthan. Some famous temples of this period are Dilwara Temples, Mirpur temple of Sirohi. There are also many Jain temples of this period in Pali district at Sewari, Nadol, Ghanerao etc.

From the 14th century and onwards, many new temples were built, including the Mahakaleshwar Temple Udaipur, the Jagdish Temple at Udaipur, the Eklingji Temple, the Jagat Shiromani Temple of Amer, and the Ranakpur Jain temple.

Forts of Rajasthan

Amer Fort, Amer, Jaipur
Bala Qila, Alwar
Barmer Fort, Barmer
Chittor Fort, Chittorgarh
Gagron Fort, Jhalawar
Gugor Fort, Baran
Jaigarh Fort, Jaipur
Jaisalmer Fort, Jaisalmer
Jalore Fort, Jalore
Jhalawar Fort, Jhalawar
Juna Fort and Temple, Barmer
Junagarh Fort, Bikaner
Khandhar Fort, Sawai Madhopur
Khejarla Fort, Jodhpur
Khimsar Fort, Nagaur
Kumbhalgarh Fort, Rajsamand
Lohagarh Fort, Bharatpur
Mehrangarh Fort, Jodhpur
Nagaur Fort, Nagaur
Nahargarh Fort, Jaipur
Nahargarh Fort, Baran
Neemrana Fort Palace, Neemrana, Alwar
Ranthambore Fort, Sawai Madhopur
Bhangarh Fort, Alwar
Taragarh Fort, Ajmer
Taragarh Fort, Bundi
Shergarh Fort, Baran
Surajgarh Fort, Surajgarh

Palaces of Rajasthan
 Alwar City Palace, Alwar
 Amber Palace, Amer, Jaipur
 Badal Mahal, Dungarpur
 Dholpur Palace, Dholpur
 Fateh Prakash Palace, Chittorgarh
 Gajner Palace and Lake, Bikaner
 Jag Mandir, Udaipur
 Jagmandir Palace, Kota
 City Palace, Jaipur
 Jal Mahal, Jaipur
 Juna Mahal, Dungarpur
 Lake Palace, Udaipur
 Lalgarh Palace and Museum, Bikaner
 Laxmi Niwas Palace, Bikaner
 Man Mahal, Pushkar
 Mandir Palace, Jaisalmer
 Monsoon Palace, Udaipur
 Moti Doongri, Alwar
 Moti Doongri, Jaipur
 Moti Mahal, Jodhpur
 Nathmal Ji Ki Haveli, Jaisalmer
 Patwon Ki Haveli, Jaisalmer
 Phool Mahal, Jodhpur
 Raj Mandir, Banswara
 Rampuria Haveli, Bikaner
 Rana Kumbha Palace, Chittorgarh
 Rani Padmini's Palace, Chittorgarh
 Ranisar Padamsar, Jodhpur
 Ratan Singh Palace, Chittorgarh
 Salim Singh Ki Haveli, Jaisalmer
 Sardar Samand Lake and Palace, Jodhpur
 Sheesh Mahal, Jodhpur
 Sisodia Rani Palace and Garden, Jaipur
 Sukh Mahal, Bundi
 Sunheri Kothi, Sawai Madhopur
 Udai Bilas Palace, Dungarpur
 City Palace, Udaipur
 Umaid Bhawan Palace, Jodhpur

Religion

Rajasthan is home to all the major religions of India. Hindus account for 90% of the population; Muslims (7.10%), Sikhs (1.27%), Jains (1%) and Sindhis make up the remaining population.

Festivals

The main religious festivals are Deepawali, Holi, Gangaur, Teej, Gogaji, Makar Sankranti, and Janmashtami as the main religion is Hinduism.

Rajasthan's desert festival in Jaisalmer is celebrated once a year during winter. People of the desert dance and sing ballads of valour, romance and tragedy. There are fairs with snake charmers, puppeteers, acrobats and folk performers. Camels play a prominent role in this festival.

Religious syncretism

Rajasthan has more popular Hindu saints, many from the Bhakti era.

Rajasthani saints hail from all castes; Maharshi Naval Ram and Umaid lakshman 
Maharaj were Bhangis, Karta Ram Maharaj was a Shudra, Sundardasa was a Vaish, and Meerabai and Ramdeoji were Rajputs. The backward caste Nayaks serve as the narrators or the devotional music (or "bhajan") for the Baba Ramdevji sect.

The most popular Hindu deities are Surya, Krishna and Rama.

Modern-day popular saints from Rajasthan have been Paramyogeshwar Sri Devpuriji of Kriya Yoga and Swami Satyananda the master of Kriya Yoga, Kundalini Yoga, Mantra Yoga and Laya yoga. Rajasthan had a massive movement to unite the Hindus and Muslims to worship God together. Saint Baba Ramdevji was adored by Muslims, equally that he was to Hindus.

Mostly Rajasthani people speak the Marwari language.

Saint Dadu Dayal was a popular figure who came from Gujarat to Rajasthan to preach the unity of Ram and Allah. Sant Rajjab was a saint born in Rajasthan who became a disciple of Dadu Dayal and spread the philosophy of unity amongst Hindu and Muslim worshipers of God.

Saint Kabir was another popular figure noted for bringing the Hindu and Muslim communities together, and stressing that God may have many forms (e.g. in the form of Rama or Allah.)

References

External links
 Arts and Culture of Rajasthan at Government of Rajasthan